The Disability Rights Education and Defense Fund (DREDF), located in Berkeley, California, and Washington, DC, USA is a national cross-disability civil rights law and policy center directed by individuals with disabilities and parents who have children with disabilities. Founded in 1979, DREDF advances the civil and human rights of people with disabilities through legal advocacy, training, education, and public policy and legislative development. The Berkeley office is located in the Ed Roberts Campus.

History 

An outgrowth of the Independent Living Movement, which had deep roots in Berkeley, California, DREDF is a national, cross-disability civil rights organization in the United States founded, managed, and directed by an alliance of people with disabilities and parents of children with disabilities. The organization derived its name from other historical civil rights groups such as the Women’s Legal Defense Fund, the NAACP Legal Defense and Educational Fund (LDF), and the Mexican American Legal Defense and Educational Fund (MALDEF).

The 1980s 

DREDF challenges discrimination, prejudice and social exclusion of people with disabilities. Its early efforts focused on:

 building alliances with the national civil rights leadership
 preventing the Reagan administration's Task Force on Regulatory Relief's attempts to de-regulate the Section 504 of the Rehabilitation Act of 1973  
 protecting regulations implementing the Education for All Handicapped Children Act (later renamed the Individuals with Disabilities Education Act (IDEA)), the federal law establishing the right to a free, appropriate, public education for all children with disabilities
 working for federal civil rights legislation affecting people with disabilities such as the Civil Rights Restoration Act of 1987, the 1986 Handicapped Children's Protection Act, the Individuals with Disabilities Education Act Amendments, and the Fair Housing Act Amendments
 writing, co-authoring, and coordinating amicus curiae briefs on early disability rights matters heard by the U.S. Supreme Court including Smith v. Robinson, Darrone, and Arline
 building a national civil rights advocacy network of people with disabilities and parents by providing in-depth training on the then-new civil rights laws, Section 504 and IDEA 
 
After a decade-long record of advocacy training, and legislative, legal, and policy victories, DREDF was uniquely situated to play a significant role in the enactment of the landmark civil rights law, the Americans with Disabilities Act of 1990 (ADA). DREDF's governmental affairs director, Patrisha Wright, known as "The General", led the national coalition advocating for enactment of the proposed law, and Arlene B. Mayerson, DREDF's legal director, developed briefing materials, legal memoranda, and legal opinions about the impact of proposed legislation at the request of members of Congress. Policy analyst Marilyn Golden led community organizing efforts. Senator Tom Harkin was lead sponsor of the ADA.

The 1990s 

Following passage of the ADA, DREDF focused on preserving the new law and shaping its implementation by providing nationwide training and technical assistance and by writing and publishing a legal series that presented ADA legislative history and commentary. In a series of cases, DREDF wins the right of children with disabilities requiring healthcare assistance (such as diabetes and asthma) to receive such assistance in pre-school and recreational settings. In an effort to promote community integration, DREDF works with community and legal groups to challenge the continued institutionalization of disabled residents in San Francisco's Laguna Honda Hospital and to create community-based alternatives. Other ADA litigation also opens doors to movie theaters, hotels, banking services, and gas stations. DREDF represents Members of Congress is a trilogy of cases involving the definition of disability under the ADA. Continuing its commitment to IDEA implementation, DREDF achieves a series of litigation victories that establish a national precedent for full inclusion of children with disabilities in regular classes in Holland v. Sacramento City School District and establishes educational rights for children with disabilities in East Palo Alto, California. As interest in disability rights gains international momentum, disability rights leaders from 17 countries invite legal and policy staff to consult and collaborate on strategies for advancing policy in their countries.

The 2000s and beyond 

DREDF organizes "From Principles to Practice", the first international disability right law symposium to be held in the United States, bringing together 150 attorneys and legal advocates from 57 countries. Transnational Publishers releases Disability Rights Law and Policy: International and National Perspectives, edited by Silvia Yee and Mary Lou Breslin. As traditional barriers to equal participation for people with disabilities begin to bend to the effect of the ADA, DREDF identifies and focuses attention on emerging challenges including thwarting legislative attempts to legalize assisted suicide and increasing access to healthcare services and improving healthcare outcomes. DREDF conducts healthcare research and publishes outcomes in peer-reviewed journals. As the US House and Senate considered enactment of the Affordable Care Act (ACA), DREDF advocated for enhanced protections and rights for people with disabilities. Following enactment of the ACA, DREDF advocates for ADA implementation in healthcare programs and services, drafts comments with colleagues on proposed regulations that create accessible medical equipment standards, and collaborates with senior groups as the ACA tests models that combine clinical care and long-term services and supports for low-income people with disabilities and seniors. Litigation against Netflix resulted in a landmark settlement that requires captioning for all streaming media the company offers, thus marking progress on applying the ADA to Internet-only businesses. Other litigation succeeds in requiring the US Social Security Administration to provide all notices to beneficiaries in alternative formats.

References

External links 
 Disability Rights Education & Defense Fund (DREDF)

Disability organizations based in the United States
Disability rights organizations